Edmund Frederick Robertson  (born 1 June 1943) is a professor emeritus of pure mathematics at the University of St Andrews.

Work
Robertson is one of the creators of the MacTutor History of Mathematics archive, along with John J. O'Connor. Robertson has written over 100 research articles, mainly on the theory of groups and semigroups. He is also the author or co-author of 17 textbooks.

Robertson obtained a Bachelor of Science degree at the University of St Andrews in 1965. He then went to the University of Warwick, where he received a Master of Science degree in 1966 and a Doctor of Philosophy degree in 1968.

In 1998, he was elected a Fellow of the Royal Society of Edinburgh.

In 2015, he received together with his colleague O'Connor, the Hirst Prize of the London Mathematical Society for his work on the MacTutor History of Mathematics archive. His thesis on "Classes of Generalised Nilpotent Groups" was done with Stewart E. Stonehewer.

Personal life
He is with his wife, Helena, and his two sons.

Bibliography
 Algebra Through Practice: A Collection of Problems in Algebra with Solutions: Books 4-6 - with T.S.Blyth, 
 Rings, Fields and Modules - with T.S.Blyth, 1985,  
  Sets and mappings - with T.S.Blyth, 1986,  
 Linear Algebra - with T.S.Blyth, 1986,  
 Essential Student Algebra: Groups - with T.S.Blyth, 1986,  
 Basic Linear Algebra - with T.S.Blyth, 1998, 
 Colin MacLaurin (1698-1746): Argyllshire's Mathematician, 2000,  
 Further Linear Algebra - with T.S.Blyth, 2002,

References

External links 
 

Group theorists
20th-century Scottish mathematicians
Fellows of the Royal Society of Edinburgh
Academics of the University of St Andrews
1943 births
Living people
21st-century Scottish mathematicians
People from St Andrews